Craige was a town in Asotin County, Washington. The GNIS classifies it as a populated place.

A post office called Craige operated from 1898 to 1941. The community was named after C. Thomas Craige.

References

Ghost towns in Washington (state)
Geography of Asotin County, Washington